Ritchie Aaron Whorton (born March 4, 1960) is an American politician who has served in the Alabama House of Representatives from the 22nd district since 2014.

References

1960 births
Living people
Republican Party members of the Alabama House of Representatives
21st-century American politicians